Hot Choice is a pay-per-view service that mainly airs adult content. It is run by In Demand Networks and is carried on some cable television systems.

History
Hot Choice was launched in 1988 as Viewer's Choice II; the channel retained the "Viewer's Choice" name until February 1993, when it was rebranded as "Hot Choice". The service had initially aired a diverse mix of comedy and action/adventure movies geared towards mainly teenagers and adults (essentially, feature films with an MPAA rating of "PG-13" or higher) that were carried over from its sister network Viewer's Choice/In Demand; and adult-oriented programming at night.

In late 1999, Hot Choice began leaning towards more "R"-rated films; more adult programming began being distributed throughout its daily schedule until 2000 when Hot Choice adopted a mostly adult programming format. During that period, some of the cable systems moved this channel to their digital cable tiers or removed it from their listings altogether. In September 2001, Hot Choice had changed their format to featuring only softcore adult programming.

See also
Playboy TV
Spice Network

References

Television channels and stations established in 1988
Commercial-free television networks
Television networks in the United States
American pornographic television channels
Pay-per-view television stations in the United States
Nudity in television